Stephen John Anderson (born 1969 in Southend) is a British musician, songwriter and record producer, best known for his work with Kylie Minogue on her tours and albums. He has also worked on songs and albums for many recording artists such as Britney Spears, Westlife, Christophe Willem, Judie Tzuke and Susan Boyle.

Life and career

Early years – Brothers in Rhythm

Remixes and releases 
Steve Anderson began his musical career at DMC Studios as one half of remix/production team Brothers in Rhythm with Dave Seaman. They went on to work with artists including Michael Jackson, David Bowie, Janet Jackson, Sting and Paul McCartney. Anderson's role at DMC was initially as an apprentice or, as he described it, "tea-boy creating some mixes for their subscription service". Anderson's first remix for Kylie Minogue under the DMC label was her 1990 disco single "Step Back In Time".

Though this remix was not officially serviced, it has been suggested that it later provided inspiration for the successful Harding/Curnow remix of the single. Further, it would lead to Anderson collaborating with Minogue on her ballad "Finer Feelings" in 1991. Recalling the important influence of the band Massive Attack's music at the time, Anderson stated in an interview:

Finer Feelings came from someone at PWL loving what we were doing with Brothers In Rhythm, which up until then had been predominantly house music, so taking on a gorgeous mid tempo was quite a risk but of course we loved the song and just embellished what was there with a whole load of piano, strings and choir… On the original 1992 remix it was purely about making the rhythm section tougher and the orchestration more lush - everyone was influenced by Massive Attack then, so that’s where we were headed”

This led to production work for the Pet Shop Boys, Take That (including the No.1s  Never Forget and Sure) and Minogue's debut album for Deconstruction Records in 1994, including "Confide In Me" which he co-wrote and produced. Extensively collaborating with Dave Seaman, Brothers in Rhythm also had mainstream hits in their own right with Peace and Harmony (1990) and Such a Good Feeling (1991), the latter reaching number 1 in the Billboard Dance Club Songs charts. Peace and Harmony secured greater exposure when it re-appeared as the B-side to Such a Good Feeling.

In 1994, the follow-up to Such a Good Feeling, Forever and a Day, was released in the U.K via Stress Records, with vocals from Charvoni, charting at number 51.

Production work 
Around the time of the Brothers in Rhythm release Forever and a Day, Seaman and Anderson featured on the first Kylie Minogue album since leaving her label PWL. The two co-wrote and produced her first single Confide In Me, which went to no. 2 in the U.K charts and signified a “reinvention” of Minogue's image and sound. According to Lee Barron,  he felt the image of the music video was an example and opening of "Indie Kylie"; an image that later progressed through the work of her 1997 album Impossible Princess. Brothers in Rhythm also produced four additional songs on the album, namely Love is Waiting,  Dangerous Game, Automatic Love and Where is the Feeling.
After the release of their 1994 Brothers in Rhythm single Forever in a Day, Anderson and Seaman concentrated on writing, producing and recording Minogue's second album for Deconstruction Records/Sony BMG, Impossible Princess. Temporarily retitled Kylie Minogue in the UK and Europe (following the death of Princess Diana), this was Minogue's sixth studio album, released on 22 October 1997 by Sony BMG and Deconstruction Records in Japan. Minogue had co-written all the songs on the album, with additional credits in production and composition; the album was also assisted by Dave Ball, Ingo Vauk, Brothers in Rhythm and Rob Dougan, among others.

The album received a polarized response from music critics. Commercially, the album reached number 10 in Australia, Scotland and the UK, but was certified Platinum by the Australian Recording Industry Association (ARIA) for physical shipment of 70,000 units.

After the release of Impossible Princess, Brothers in Rhythm continued to collaborate, having their remixes on single releases by D:Ream, M People, Placebo, Garbage and Alanis Morissette.

While the Brothers in Rhythm never officially split up, the beginning of the millennium saw Dave Seamen concentrate on his DJ career while Anderson consolidated his career in music production, song-writing and theatre.

Production and songwriting
Steve Anderson has written and co-written songs and produced music for recording artists including Kylie Minogue, Britney Spears, Markus Feehily, Holly Valance, Take That, Susan Boyle and Delta Goodrem.

After completing Impossible Princess for Minogue in 1997, Anderson continued to write with Minogue for the album that became Light Years. Recalling a sense of freedom during the early period of recording in 1999, Anderson states:
The thing is, when we get together to write, we just do what we feel like. We never try to pitch at an album or sound, so often we write something we love that happily sits on a b-side, and that’s fine with us. If you take something like Harmony for instance - the sun was shining at Real World and we just wanted to do something really bright, warm and summery with a lovely lyric. We knew there was no way it was going to fit on an album, but that's not a good enough reason not to write it.
Released in 2000 through Parlophone and widely seen as Minogue's comeback album, Light Years features three songs composed by Anderson (So Now Goodbye, Butterfly and Bittersweet Goodbye). He also co-wrote Dancefloor and Give It To Me on the follow-up album Fever, which reached the number one slot in the UK, Australian, Austrian, German and Irish album charts and number 3 on the US Billboard 200.

Anderson also worked on songs for Britney Spears, including "Breathe on Me" for her 2003 album In The Zone and two unreleased songs ("State of Grace" and "Grow") originally intended for her album Blackout.

In 2003, he produced and co-wrote three songs for the Holly Valance album State of Mind, released on Warner Bros. Records. He also co-wrote and produced "Everything You Ever Wanted" for the English-Irish Pop Girl group Girls Aloud's debut album Sound of the Underground (Polydor / Universal International).

In 2009, he produced "Talk Me Down" for the Irish boy band Westlife's Where We Are album (S / RCA / Sony Music. He also collaborated with Australian singer Natalie Bassingthwaighte on the song "Supersensual" for her number 1 selling album 1000 Stars (Sony). He co-wrote and produced the song "Entre Nous et le Sol" for French singer Christophe Willem's album Caféine(Columbia Records / Sony Music, which was subsequently released as a single in 2010 with the English-language version of the album, Heartbox with the restored original title, State of Grace.

In 2010, he wrote and produced the song "I will reach you", that appeared as an album track on Westlife's Gravity. In the same year he wrote the lead single to Spanish singer Edurne's album Nueva Piel (Sony Music Spain), "Soy Como Soy".

In 2011, he was reunited with Christophe Willem, producing his entire Prismophonic album for Columbia / Sony Music.

In 2012, he also produced the English version of Willem's album, Love Shot Me Down. As part of Kylie Minogue's K25 celebrations, Anderson also produced  The Abbey Road Sessions album, on which he co-wrote the single "Flower".

In 2013 he produced Susan Boyle's Home for Christmas album. In 2014 he produced Boyle's next album, Hope.

In 2015 he produced songs on Westlife's Markus Feehily album Fire and numerous songs for Kylie Minogue's Christmas album, Kylie Christmas (Parlophone).

In 2016 he wrote and produced Paola Iezzi's single "Lovenight". He also became heavily involved in the production, arrangement and release of new singer Harriet and her self-titled debut album (Brightstar Records). He also produced Boyle's Christmas album A Wonderful World (Syco), featuring covers of Madonna, Robbie Williams and ABBA songs. Anderson also produced Minogue's expanded re-release of her Christmas album, Kylie Christmas: Snow Queen Edition.

In 2018, he produced and wrote a couple of tracks on the solo debut album of Steps' singer Claire Richards. He also co-produced the debut album ‘Brave’ by 15 year old Beau Dermott for (Decca) Records with Cliff Masterson

Music director – pop concert tours

Though its chart performance was somewhat lackluster, a key success of Kylie Minogue's Impossible Princess era was her live tour Intimate and Live in 1998. Performing to sell out shows in Australia and London, Minogue selected Anderson as its musical director for all corresponding concerts. This relationship continues with Anderson providing essential arrangement production work for Kylie Minogue's On a Night Like This tour (2001), KylieFever tour (2002), Money Can't Buy (2004), Showgirl: The Greatest Hits Tour (2005), Showgirl: The Homecoming Tour (2006-2007), KylieX2008 (2008-2009), For You, for Me (2009), Aphrodite: Les Folies Tour (2011), Anti Tour (2012), Kiss Me Once Tour (2014-2015) and A Kylie Christmas at the Royal Albert Hall (2015-2016). Outside his live work for Minogue, Anderson has scored the live arrangements for tours and shows by Westlife, Delta Goodrem, Leona Lewis and most recently Lush in October 2016. He has also scored notable radio and T.V shows including Live Lounge for Leona Lewis and Little Mix and An Audience With Kylie Minogue which featured a duet with Kermit the Frog.

Music supervisor – theatre
In 2007, alongside working on the Showgirl tour, Anderson and others from Kylie Minogue's creative team, including choreographer Ashley Wallen, vocal arranger Terry Ronald and creative director William Baker, opened their re-worked version of Jonathan Larson's musical Rent, Rent: Remixed at London's Duke of York's Theatre. The show starred Luke Evans, and Siobhan Donaghy as Mimi. While the show's stripped down adaptation drew criticism, Sam Marlow, theatre critic for the Times, stated
Anderson has done a cracking job of funking up Larson’s score, replacing overweening guitar rock with pumping gay club anthems and diva pop, flavoured with rippling keyboards and electronica.

The same creative team would reunite for several versions of The Hurly Burly Show, a Burlesque Revue playing at various West End theatres between 2010 and 2012, starring the British Neo-Burlesque performer Miss Polly Rae. The show was well received by Theatre critics, with The Daily Telegraph's Charles Spencer giving it a four-star rating, noting the quality of the show's musical numbers, while The Guardian's Michael Billington praised its slick direction.

Three successful incarnations of the show led to further theatrical outings for Anderson. Collaborations to date include:
Little Belter (London and UK Tour, 2012)
Orchid – Where Desire Blooms (Miami, 2012)
Some Girl I Used To Know (Leeds, London West End and UK Tour, 2014)
The Supreme Fabulettes – Viva La Drag (London West End and UK Tour 2014–2015)
Chandelier (Celebrity Cruises, 2015)
Elyria (Celebrity Cruises, 2015).

In 2014 it was announced that Anderson was working on a new musical based on the music of Minogue. In September 2015 Minogue herself confirmed that the musical had "momentum" once again, after being "in talks". A successful trademark registration by Minogue's family company from 2012 indicates that the musical's working title is Lucky: The Kylie Minogue Musical.

Anderson is currently working on a new musical, The Most Beautiful Man In New York, with long time collaborators Ian Masterson and Terry Ronald.

Discography

With Brothers in Rhythm

Singles

As producer and songwriter (selected discography)

External links 
 Official website
 Steve Anderson on Twitter

References 

Living people
Music directors
English record producers
English songwriters
People from Southend-on-Sea
1969 births